Ezequiel Viñao (born July 21, 1960 in  Buenos Aires) is an Argentine-American composer. He emigrated to the United States in 1980 and studied at the Juilliard School. His compositions include La Noche de las Noches (1989) for string quartet and electronics, which won First Prize at UNESCO's Latin-American Rostrum of Composers in 1993; six Études (1993) for piano solo, which were awarded a Kennedy Center Friedheim Award in 1995; a second string quartet The Loss and the Silence (2004), commissioned by the Juilliard String Quartet and titled with a quote from J.R.R. Tolkien's The Tale of Aragorn and Arwen; The Wanderer (2005) for a cappella voices, commissioned by Chanticleer and Chicago a cappella, and titled for the Old English poem of the same name; and Sirocco Dust (2009), commissioned by the Library of Congress for the St. Lawrence String Quartet. He currently resides in New York City.

References

External links
Official Ezequiel Viñao website
Wnyc.org: Ezequiel Viñao: An Interview
BIS Records AB: Ezequiel Viñao 
New York University.edu: Ezequiel Viñao

American classical composers
Argentine classical composers
Postmodern composers
1960 births
Living people
American male classical composers
Juilliard School alumni
Musicians from Buenos Aires
Argentine emigrants to the United States
20th-century Argentine artists
21st-century American composers
20th-century classical composers
21st-century classical composers
20th-century American composers
20th-century American male musicians
21st-century American male musicians